Щ-215 (transliterated as Shch-215 or sometimes SC-215) was a Soviet Navy , Type X. She was built at the Sudostroytelnyi zavod imeny 61 kommunara in Mykolaiv, Ukrainian SSR, and entered service in October 1938 with the Soviet Black Sea fleet based at Sevastopol. Shch-215 survived the Second World War, was reclassified С-215 (S-215 in the Roman alphabet) in 1949 and was decommissioned in 1955.

Shch-215 is notorious for an attack in February 1944 when she torpedoed and sank the motor schooner . Mefküre was carrying between 300 and 400 Jewish refugees, all but five of whom were killed.

Wartime service
On 9 October 1941, north of Cape Emine in Bulgaria, Shch-215 attacked what she identified as a patrol vessel. The submarine fired a torpedo but it missed.

On 18 November, east-north-east of Tsarevo, Bulgaria, Shch-215 torpedoed and sank the  Turkish steamship .

On 20 June 1942, south of the mouth of the Sulina branch of the Danube Delta, Shch-215 attacked the German minesweepers FR 1 and FR 11 with two torpedoes at the vessels, both of which missed.

Late on 23 January 1943, south of Cape Tarkhankut in Crimea, Shch-215 fired three torpedoes at a German barge, all of which missed. In the small hours of the next day, west of Yevpatoria in Crimea, Shch-215 attacked the German barge F 125. The submarine fired three torpedoes and her deck gun at the barge, all of which missed.

On 8 March, west-south-west of Cape Tarkhankut, Shch-215 attacked the German  tanker Wolga-Don escorted by two patrol vessels. The submarine fired three torpedoes at the tanker, all of which missed. On 13 March, south-west of Cape Tarkhankut, Shch-215 attacked the Hungarian  cargo ship . The submarine fired two torpedoes at the freighter but both missed.

On 16 May, south of Sudak in Crimea, Shch-215 fired two torpedoes at the German barge F 170. On 24 May, north-north-west of Sevastopol, Shch-215 attacked the Italian  tanker  with four torpedoes, all of which missed.

On 30 August, north of the Bosphorus in Turkey, Shch-215 torpedoed and sank the German  cargo ship .

Early on 11 November, west of Yevpatoria, Shch-215 fired two torpedoes at an unidentified merchant ship, both of which missed. Two hours later Shch-215 fired two more torpedoes at a merchant ship, probably the same vessel, but again both missed. Early on 15 November off Cape Tarkhankut, Shch-215 fired two torpedoes at a German convoy of barges and smaller vessels. Four hours later she fired two torpedoes, sinking the German barge F 592. The next day, west of Yevpatoria, Shch-215 fired two torpedoes at the German minesweeper MT 1, both of which missed.

On 27 March 1944, in the western part of the Black Sea, Shch-215 sighted the German  cargo ship  being escorted by U-Jäger ("Submarine chaser") UJ-117. She attacked with four torpedoes, all of which missed.

On 16 April, midway between Constanța and Sevastopol, Shch-215 attacked a German convoy. The submarine fired four torpedoes, missing U-Jäger UJ-115.

On 24 August, north of Cape Emine, Shch-215 torpedoed and sank the Bulgarian  sailing vessel Vita. The next day she torpedoed and sank the Turkish  cargo ship .

MV Mefküre massacre
On 5 August 1944, north-west of the Bosphorus, Shch-215 sank the Turkish small motor schooner  by torpedo and gunfire. Mefküres tonnage is uncertain: some sources state ; others . As well as torpedoing Mefküre, the submarine fired 90 rounds from her 45-mm guns and 650 rounds from her 7.62 mm machine guns. Shch-215's commander, A.I. Strizhak, claimed that he had seen about 200 armed men aboard Mefküre.

In fact Mefküre was carrying Jewish refugees who had embarked at Constanța bound for Palestine. Exactly how many refugees were crowded aboard is unknown, but a number estimated to be between 289 and 394 were killed. Six of Mefküres seven crew and only five of the refugees survived. At daybreak they were rescued by the merchant ship Bulbul, which was also carrying Jewish refugees on the same route as part of the same charter.

Post-war fate
On 16 June 1949 Shch-215 was reclassified S-215 (С-215 in the Cyrillic alphabet).

S-215 was laid up on 13 July 1953, decommissioned on 29 December 1955 and scrapped at Inkerman on 18 January 1956.

See also
, which sank the Jewish refugee ship  in 1942.

References

Further reading

1937 ships
Shchuka-class submarines
1944 in the Soviet Union
Ships built in the Soviet Union
World War II submarines of the Soviet Union